Dasun Tharaka Kottehewa (born 27 June 1985) is a Sri Lankan first-class cricketer who played for Nondescripts Cricket Club from 2005 to 2012.

Kottehewa captained the First XI at Royal College, Colombo, in 2003-04. In a List A match against Ragama Cricket Club at Moors Sports Club Ground in December 2007, he took two hat-tricks in one innings, and finished with figures of 8 for 20.

References

External links
 

1985 births
Living people
Alumni of Royal College, Colombo
Sri Lankan cricketers
Nondescripts Cricket Club cricketers
Cricketers from Colombo